The concept of out-of-band infrastructure (OOBI) has been used throughout the telecom industry for voice communication since the mid-1950s. Having a critical requirement to always provide dial-tone for health and safety reasons, the telecom industry created elaborate mechanisms which allowed quick service restoration using alternative communication pathways which were physically and logically separate from the voice traffic itself. This early concept of a distinct 'control path' is considered the foundation of out-of-band infrastructures and simply put, refers to the ability to establish distinct remedial control paths adjacent to production communications pathways.

Out-of-band, indicating that the control signals are sent separately from the data, is in contrast to in-band signalling where the control is sent as special forms of data communications.  An example of in-band signalling would be Escape sequence coding.

Computer systems management

Out-of-band management is the adaptation of OOBI for the management of computer servers and data networking hardware, typically over Ethernet and cost-effective wide area networks.